The Los Angeles Riptide were a lacrosse team based in Carson, California. From 2006 to 2008, they played in Major League Lacrosse and ceased operations before the 2009 season.

Franchise history
In March 2005, MLL announced that Los Angeles would receive the first of the planned four western expansion teams for the 2006 season.

The Riptide's ownership group was the Anschutz Entertainment Group. This group also owns and operates the NHL's Los Angeles Kings, their minor-league affiliates the Manchester Monarchs and Reading Royals and MLS  Los Angeles Galaxy.

The first Los Angeles Ripide player was Michael Watson, who was selected with the top pick in the 2006 MLL expansion draft.

Season-by-season

Coaches and others 
Head coach – John Tucker
Assistant coach – Mike Allan
Assistant coach – Shawn Trell
Head Athletic Trainer – Paul Lacanilao 
Team Physician – Dr. Luga Podesta, M.D.
Equipment Manager – Brian Eisenberg
Team Administrator – Shant Kasparian

References

Defunct Major League Lacrosse teams
Lacrosse clubs established in 2006
2006 establishments in California
2008 disestablishments in California
Sports clubs disestablished in 2008
Lacrosse teams in California
Lacrosse in Los Angeles
Riptide